Bear Lake County Airport  is a county-owned, public-use airport in Bear Lake County, Idaho, United States. It is  located three nautical miles (6 km) east of the central business district of Paris, Idaho. This airport is included in the National Plan of Integrated Airport Systems for 2011–2015, which categorized it as a general aviation facility.

Facilities and aircraft 
Bear Lake County Airport covers an area of 1,180 acres (478 ha) at an elevation of 5,932 feet (1,808 m) above mean sea level. It has two runways with asphalt surfaces: 10/28 is 5,728 by 75 feet (1,746 x 23 m) and 16/34 is 4,590 by 60 feet (1,399 x 18 m).

For the 12-month period ending July 6, 2012, the airport had 2,400 general aviation aircraft operations, an average of 200 per month. At that time there were four single-engine aircraft based at this airport.

References

External links 
 Bear Lake County Airport (1U7) at ITD Airport Directory
 Aerial image as of August 1992 from USGS The National Map
 

Airports in Idaho
Bear Lake County, Idaho